Královští Lvi Hradec Králové is a junior ice hockey team from Hradec Králové, Czech Republic. The organization used to have a senior men's team which played in the Czech 1.liga, the second level of Czech ice hockey. The men's team dissolved in 2013 after HC České Budějovice sold the Extraliga license to the city of Hradec Králové. It was replaced by Mountfield HK. Královští Lvi still exists as a youth team of Mountfield HK, but it doesn't have a men's team.

History
The club was founded as BK Hradec Králové in 1926. They have changed their name eight times in history:
 1948 : Sokol Škoda Hradec Králové
 1952 : Spartak Hradec Králové ZVÚ
 1976 : TJ Stadion Hradec Králové
 1992 : HC Stadion Hradec Králové
 1994 : HC LEV Hradec Králové
 2000 : HC Hradec Králové
 2002 : HC VCES Hradec Králové
 2012 : Královští Lvi Hradec Králové

Achievements
Czech 2.liga champion: 1978.

External links
http://www.hchk.cz/ Official site

Ice hockey teams in the Czech Republic
Ice hockey clubs established in 1926
Sport in Hradec Králové
1926 establishments in Czechoslovakia